Crotti is an Italian surname. Notable people with the surname include:

Ambrogio Crotti, Italian musician
Archangelo Crotti, (fl. 1608), composer
Carlo Crotti (born 1900), Italian footballer
Jean Crotti (1878–1958), French painter

Italian-language surnames